Moudja Sié Ouattara (born 20 May 2002) is an Ivorian professional footballer who plays as a winger and attacking midfielder for  club Cholet.

Career 
Having joined from Paris FC in 2017, Ouattara signed his first professional contract for Bordeaux in June 2020, a deal lasting until June 2023. On 2 January 2022, he made his professional debut for the club in a 3–0 Coupe de France loss to Brest.

On 13 June 2022, Ouattara signed for Championnat National side Cholet.

References 

2002 births
Living people
People from Bouaké
Ivorian footballers
French footballers
French sportspeople of Ivorian descent
Ivorian emigrants to France
Naturalized citizens of France
Black French sportspeople
Association football midfielders
Paris FC players
FC Girondins de Bordeaux players
SO Cholet players
Championnat National 3 players